Henry W. Corbett was an American businessman and politician.

Henry Corbett may also refer to:
Henry L. Corbett, American businessman and politician (and a grandson of Henry W. Corbett)
Sir Henry Corbet, 6th Baronet (died 1750), of the Corbet baronets

See also
Harry Corbett (disambiguation)
Corbett (surname)